The 2021 Portuguese Presidency of the Council of the European Union (PPUE2021) was Portugal's fourth presidency of the Council, held between 1 January and 30 June 2021. Portugal held its first presidency from 1 January until 30 June 1992.

Portugal is part of the 10th Presidency Trio, together with Germany and Slovenia, with which it is working in close trilateral cooperation. This trio is the first in the second cycle of presidencies.

Presidency trio

Political priorities 
The political priorities of the Portuguese presidency of the council are:

Promoting Europe's recovery, leveraged by the climate and digital transitions
Implementing the Social Pillar of the European Union as a key element to ensure a fair and inclusive climate and digital transition
Strengthening Europe's strategic autonomy keeping it open to the world

National government 

 President of the Republic Marcelo Rebelo de Sousa
 Prime Minister António Costa
 President of the Assembly of the Republic Eduardo Ferro Rodrigues

Permanent mission to the EU

References 

2021 in politics
2021 in Portugal
2021 in the European Union
Portugal and the European Union
Presidency of the Council of the European Union